The EMD GP9 is a four-axle diesel-electric locomotive built by General Motors' Electro-Motive Division between 1954 and 1959. The GP9 succeeded the GP7 as the second model of EMD's General Purpose (GP) line, incorporating a new sixteen-cylinder engine which generated . This locomotive type was offered both with and without control cabs; locomotives built without control cabs were called GP9B locomotives.

EMD constructed 3,626 GP9s, including 165 GP9Bs. An additional 646 GP9s were built by General Motors Diesel, EMD's Canadian subsidiary, for a total of 4,257 GP9s produced when Canadian production ended in 1963. The GP9 was succeeded by the similar but slightly more powerful GP18.

Design and Production
EMD designed the GP9 as an improved version of the GP7, with an increase in power from 1,500 hp to 1,750 hp, and a change in prime mover to the latest version of the 567 engine, the 567C. Externally, the GP9 strongly resembled its predecessor. Most were built with high short hoods, but the Southern Pacific ordered a number with low short hoods for improved crew visibility.

EMD built GP9s at its LaGrange, Illinois facility until 1959, when American production was ended in favor of the GP18. GMD production in Canada continued until August 1963, when the final GP9 was produced.

Rebuilds

There were 40 GP9M units built that are included in the 3,441 units built for United States railroads. A GP9M was built with parts from another older EMD locomotive, either an F unit or a damaged GP7. The use of parts from these older locomotives caused the GP9Ms to have a lower power rating than a GP9.

Many rebuilt GP9s remain in service today with shortline railroads and industrial operators. Some remain in rebuilt form on some major Class I railroads, as switcher locomotives although most Class 1 railroads stopped using these locomotives by the 1980s. Canadian National still had 29 GP9RM locomotives in operation, as of 2022.
Canadian Pacific had many GP9u locomotives in operation; however, they were all retired in 2015.

Several GP9s were rebuilt with a  CAT 3512 and re-classified as GP15C.

The Illinois Central Railroad rebuilt some of its GP9s with their front (short) hood reduced in height for improved crew visibility. The IC designated these rebuilt locomotives GP10.

EMD has rebuilt and continues to rebuild GP9s into what it calls the GP20C-ECO, which is repowered with an EMD 8-710-G3A engine in place of the original 567 prime mover.

Preservation
At least 23 GP9 locomotives have been preserved at various railroad museums, as "park engines", and as excursion engines according to The Diesel Shop:
 B&O 6607, originally numbered 3414, is at the B&O Railroad Museum, Baltimore, Maryland, in operating condition.
 Southern Pacific 3194, a GP9R rebuild built as Texas and New Orleans 281, is at the Golden Gate RR Museum, California. It is in operating condition.
 Northern Pacific 245 preserved at the Lake Superior Railroad Museum in Duluth, currently painted as North Shore Scenic Railroad 245.

See also 

 List of GM-EMD locomotives
 List of GMD Locomotives

References

 
 
 
  Extra 2200 South, Issue no. 32, January-February 1972 Early Geep Tally- Part II 
 Extra 2200 South, Issue no.48, Sep-Oct 1974
 Extra 2200 South, Issue no.49, Nov-Dec 1974

External links

B-B locomotives
GP09
GP09
Diesel-electric locomotives of the United States
Railway locomotives introduced in 1954
Locomotives with cabless variants
Standard gauge locomotives of the United States
Standard gauge locomotives of Canada
Standard gauge locomotives of Mexico
Standard gauge locomotives of Venezuela
Standard gauge locomotives of Peru
5 ft 3 in gauge locomotives
Diesel-electric locomotives of Canada
Diesel-electric locomotives of Mexico
Diesel-electric locomotives of Venezuela
Diesel-electric locomotives of Peru